Fort Sisseton near Britton, South Dakota was established in 1864.  As Fort Sisseton Historic State Park, it was designated as a State Historical Park in 1959.  Fort Sisseton is listed on the U.S. National Register of Historic Places.

It has 14 of its original buildings remaining.

The listing included 15 contributing buildings and 9 contributing sites.
Fort Sisseton State Park has a festival the first weekend of June each year with entertainment and reenacting of fort activities. It was used by the United States Army from 1864 to 1889 as an outpost inhabited by cavalry and infantry soldiers. Fort Sisseton was originally named Fort Wadsworth until it was changed to Fort Sisseton on August 29, 1876. The name was changed due to the fact a Fort Wadsworth already existed in New York, and to honor the Sisseton band of Sioux that provided scouts to the fort.

Buffalo Soldiers at the Fort
Companies E and G of the 25th Infantry Regiment, an African-American unit, were both reassigned to Fort Sisseton in May 1884 after Fort Hale was abandoned. These companies remained until 1888 when they were reassigned elsewhere.

See also
List of South Dakota state parks
List of the oldest buildings in South Dakota

References

External links

 Fort Sisseton Historic State Park - official site

Government buildings completed in 1864
Infrastructure completed in 1864
Buildings and structures in Marshall County, South Dakota
Museums in Marshall County, South Dakota
Military and war museums in South Dakota
State parks of South Dakota
Protected areas of Marshall County, South Dakota
Pre-statehood history of South Dakota
Protected areas established in 1959
1864 establishments in Dakota Territory
1959 establishments in South Dakota
Sisseton
Sisseton
Historic districts on the National Register of Historic Places in South Dakota
National Register of Historic Places in Marshall County, South Dakota